The Changsha–Zhangjiajie Expressway, commonly referred to as the Changzhang Expressway is an expressway that connects Changsha, Hunan, China, and Zhangjiajie, Hunan. The expressway is a spur of G55 Erenhot–Guangzhou Expressway and is entirely in Hunan Province.

It connects the following prefecture-level cities, all of which are in Hunan Province:
Changsha
Yiyang
Changde
Zhangjiajie

References

Chinese national-level expressways
Expressways in Hunan
Expressways in Changsha
Expressways in Changde